"Nobody Lives Without Love" is a song by Scottish singer-songwriter Eddi Reader, released in 1995 from the Batman Forever soundtrack. It was written by Tonio K and Larry Klein, and produced by Trevor Horn. "Nobody Lives Without Love" was released as a single in the UK and Europe, and reached No. 84 on the UK Singles Chart.

Critical reception
In a review of the Batman Forever soundtrack, John Everson of the Southtown Star described the song as "the album's sweetest ballad" which "sounds more like Everything but the Girl" than Tracey Thorn's contribution to the soundtrack. Neil Davidson of The Canadian Press commented: "Despite the bang-bang nature of this action flick, some of the best stuff is lo-fi and low-volume. The best examples are Eddi Reader's "Nobody Lives Without Love" and Mazzy Star's "Tell Me Now"".

Scott Hinkley Jr. of the Gannett News Service wrote: "Aside from the big names [on the soundtrack], there is another song that could see heavy radio play. "Nobody Lives Without Love" by Eddi Reader is a ballad that rivals Brandy's contribution ("Where Are You Now?"). If the rest of her material is as impressive as her voice, Reader could get as big a boost from this record as the movie itself". Brian S. Maloney of the Santa Cruz Sentinel felt that "a compelling case can be made for Eddi Reader's ballad".

Track listing
CD single
"Nobody Lives Without Love" - 5:05
"Wonderful Lie" - 4:32
"Red Face Big Sky" - 4:10

CD single (UK promo)
"Nobody Lives Without Love" (Edit) - 4:09

Personnel
Nobody Lives Without Love
 Eddi Reader - vocals
 George De Angelis - keyboards, programming
 Greg Bone - guitars
 Roy Dodds - drums

Production
 Trevor Horn - producer of "Nobody Lives Without Love"
 Tim Weidner - engineer and mixing on "Nobody Lives Without Love"
 Greg Penny - producer of "Wonderful Lie" and "Red Face Big Sky"

Charts

References

1995 songs
1995 singles
Blanco y Negro Records singles
Song recordings produced by Trevor Horn
Songs written by Larry Klein
Batman (1989 film series)